Tebenna pychnomochla is a species of moth of the family Choreutidae. It is found in Uganda.

References

Endemic fauna of Uganda
Tebenna
Insects of Uganda
Moths of Africa
Moths described in 1965